Medieval Town of Dubrovnik is medieval fortress in the area of Višnjica, Ilijaš municipality, Bosnia and Herzegovina. In 2014 it was declared as National monument of Bosnia and Herzegovina.

History 

Although there are no precise data on the origin of the city, it is assumed that it was built in the 13th century because it was first mentioned in the Dubrovnik archives, on July 11, 1404.

Name 

It is believed that the town was named after the medieval merchants from Dubrovnik who came in that period with the approval of the Bosnian king to exploit the mines of lead, zinc, gold and other precious materials.

References

External links 

National Monuments of Bosnia and Herzegovina
Ilijaš
Forts in Bosnia and Herzegovina